The seventh season of Mad TV, an American sketch comedy series, originally aired in the United States on the Fox Network between September 22, 2001, and May 18, 2002.

Summary 
Debra Wilson became the only member left from the original 1995-1996 cast following Nicole Sullivan's departure at the end of season six. The previous season's feature players, Andrew Daly and Stephnie Weir were promoted to repertory players. New cast members hired this season include: Frank Caliendo, Kathryn Fiore, Jill-Michele Meleán, Taran Killam (the youngest Mad TV cast member at 19 years old, the only Mad TV cast member to get his start on a children's television show [Nickelodeon's The Amanda Show] and the second MADtv cast member after Jeff Richards to later be hired as a Saturday Night Live cast member), and Bobby Lee (the first, and only, East Asian-American cast member).

Guest stars this season included David Carradine, Michelle Trachtenberg, Todd Bridges, Vivica A. Fox, Frankie Muniz, Amanda Bynes, *NSYNC members Lance Bass and Joey Fatone, wrestlers Triple H and Stone Cold Steve Austin, The Man Show hosts Adam Carolla and Jimmy Kimmel, and rappers DMX, Ja Rule, Insane Clown Posse, Master P., Method Man, Redman, and the RZA. Trachtenberg's appearance is notable, as her performance in a Buffy the Vampire Slayer parody sketch netted Tratchenberg a nomination for a Young Artist Award for Best Performance in a TV Comedy Series.

This season is also the show's longest with 30 episodes, as the extra episodes from season six that were created in the event that a Writers Guild of America strike halted production ended up airing in season seven. One can tell these are season six episodes because of the appearances of former cast members, Nicole Sullivan, Christian Duguay, and Nelson Ascencio.

This season is the last for Alex Borstein, Will Sasso, and Andrew Daly and the only season for Taran Killam

Opening montage 
The Mad TV logo appears on the screen and the theme song, which is performed by the hip-hop group Heavy D & the Boyz, begins. A voice announces "It's Mad TV! Starring...," and then alphabetically introduces each repertory cast member, followed by the featured cast. The screen splits into several different live-action clips of cast members performing recurring characters. When the last cast member is introduced, the music stops and the title sequence ends with the phrase "You are now watching Mad TV."

Cast

Repertory cast members
 Alex Borstein  (19/25 episodes) 
 Frank Caliendo  (15/25 episodes) 
 Mo Collins  (25/25 episodes) 
 Andrew Daly  (25/25 episodes) 
 Michael McDonald  (25/25 episodes) 
 Will Sasso  (25/25 episodes) 
 Aries Spears  (24/25 episodes) 
 Stephnie Weir  (25/25 episodes) 
 Debra Wilson  (25/25 episodes) 

Featured cast members
 Kathryn Fiore  (16/25 episodes) 
 Taran Killam  (13/25 episodes) 
 Bobby Lee  (13/25 episodes) 
 Jill-Michele Meleán  (2/25 episodes)

Writers

Bryan Adams (eps. 1-25)
Dick Blasucci (eps. 1-25)
Alex Borstein (eps. 11, 13, 15)
Garry Campbell (writing supervisor) (eps. 1–25)
Kal Clarke (eps. 15–25)
Chris Cluess (eps. 1–25)
Gabrielle Collins (WGA Trainee) (eps. 4, 17)
Steven Cragg (eps. 1–25)
John Crane (eps. 1–25)
Lauren Dombrowski (eps. 1–25)
Michael Hitchcock (eps. 1–25)
Jennifer Joyce (eps. 1–25)
Kevin Kataoka (eps. 1–9)
Scott King (writing supervisor) (eps. 1–25)
Michael Koman (eps. 5, 23) (both Season 05 Encore)
Bruce McCoy (eps. 1–25)
Michael McDonald (eps. 2, 3, 5, 6, 8, 9, 12–17, 19–22, 25)
Tami Sagher (eps. 1–25)
Will Sasso (eps. 13, 22)
Devon Shepard (eps. 1–25)
Rich Talarico (eps. 1–25)
Bryan Tucker (eps. 1–25)
Mike Upchurch (eps. 1–9)
Stephnie Weir (eps. 1, 4, 6, 17, 20, 22, 25)
Jim Wise (eps. 12–25)

Episodes

Home Release
This season is available on HBO Max, with episodes 4, 6, 8, 11, 12, 13, 15, 16, 17, 20, 21, 22, and 25 missing.

External links 
 Mad TV - Official Website
 

07
2001 American television seasons
2002 American television seasons